Queer is an umbrella term for sexual and gender minorities.

Queer or Queers may also refer to:

Arts and entertainment
Queer (novel), by William S. Burroughs, published 1985
Queer (Thompson Twins album), 1991 
Queer (The Wolfgang Press album), 1991
"Queer" (song), by Garbage, 1995
"Queer", a song by Arca featuring Planningtorock from Kick IIII
"Queer", a song by Brockhampton from Saturation II
Queers (TV series), a 2017 British TV drama
The Queers, an American punk rock band

Places
Queer Creek (disambiguation)
Queer Island, Alaska, U.S.
Queer Lake, New York, U.S.
Queer Mountain, Victoria Land, Antarctica

See also

Genderqueer, or non-binary gender